Thirman L. Milner (born October 29, 1933) is an American politician from Hartford, Connecticut. A Democrat, he served as the 62nd Mayor of Hartford from 1981 to 1987 and was the first popularly elected black mayor in New England.

Early life
Thirman Milner was born in Hartford, Connecticut's North End. Milner was the fifth child born out of six children. Milner's father died when Milner was young. Milner largely grew up on Hartford's South End, though he spent some parts of his youth living in the South End and Asylum Hill.

During his childhood his mother, Grace Milner, who was working to support her family, went on welfare.

During part of his childhood, he lived in Glastonbury, Connecticut with a relative that operated a summer camp. While living in Glastonbury, Milner became a member of Future Farmers of America, worked as a camp counselor, and attended high school at Glastonbury High School, which he dropped out of during his junior year.

In the early 1950s, he received a high school equivalency diploma while serving in the United States Air Force.

Milner attended New York University, initially wanting to major in pharmacy. While in college, a speech by Martin Luther King Jr. inspired Milner to pursue a life of public service.

Milner worked as a hospital orderly,  a clerk at a drug store, an insurance salesman, an anti-poverty worker, and a civil rights activist.

In 1976, he ran a primary campaign against Connecticut state representative Cylde Billington Jr. He lost the primary to Billington by only five votes. In 1978, he challenged Billington again, and won election.

In 1978, he worked on the mayoral campaign of George A. Athanson.

Political career

Mayoralty
In 1981, Thirman Milner defeated incumbent George A. Athanson in a second Democratic primary election. Athanson had won the first primary by 94 votes but was re-run after Milner contested the results and a court agreed that there had been irregularities. Milner was elected mayor in a three-way race against Independent Robert F. Ludgin and Republican Michael T. McGarry. He was the first popularly elected black mayor in New England. Milner won re-election in 1983 and again in 1985.

State assembly
After serving three terms as mayor of Hartford, Milner was elected to a single term in the Connecticut House of Representatives, representing the seventh district. He served on the Connecticut Senate starting in 1992, declining to run for reelection from the second district in 1994 due to heath reasons.

Legacy 
The Thirman L. Milner Middle Grades Academy (formerly Thirman L. Milner School), a middle school in Hartford, is named after the Mayor.

Works
Up from Slavery: A History from Slavery to City Hall in New England

External links 
 Thirman L. Milner on C-SPAN

References 

1933 births
Living people
African-American state legislators in Connecticut
African-American mayors in Connecticut
Mayors of Hartford, Connecticut
Democratic Party members of the Connecticut House of Representatives
Democratic Party Connecticut state senators
New York University alumni
African-American people in Connecticut politics
21st-century African-American people
20th-century African-American people